The Acheron River is a river in Canterbury, New Zealand and flows from Lake Lyndon south into the Rakaia River.

Small deposits of coal are found near the river. In the 1870s, a proposal existed to extend the Whitecliffs Branch, a branch line railway, through the Rakaia Gorge to the Acheron River to access these coal deposits, and an 1880 Royal Commission on New Zealand's railway network was in favour of this extension, but it never came to fruition.

Head: 
 Confluence with Rakaia:

See also
Acheron River, Marlborough
Acheron (river in Greece)

References 

Rivers of Canterbury, New Zealand
Rivers of New Zealand